Beatrice Heuser (born 15 March 1961 in Bangkok), is an historian and political scientist. She holds the chair of International Relations at the University of Glasgow.

Heuser has a B.A. in History from Bedford College, a M.A. in International History from the London School of Economics and a D.Phil. in Political Science from the University of Oxford. In addition, she holds a Higher Doctorate from the University of Marburg. From 1989 to 1991, she worked at the Royal Institute of International Affairs in London. Subsequently, she became a lecturer and later a professor of Strategic Studies at King's College London. She has also taught in France at the University of Reims, and the Graduate School of Journalism in Lille, and in Germany at the University of Potsdam and Bundeswehr University of Munich. 'From 2003 to 2007 the director of the research section of the German Armed Forces Military History Research Office in Potsdam from 2003 to 2007.  In 2007 she was appointed to a Chair of International Relations at the University of Reading.   She left Reading for the Chair of IR at Glasgow in 2017.

In 2011/2012 she held visiting professorships at the University of Paris 8 (St Denis) and the University of Paris IV (Sorbonne) - the Chaire Dupront.  From October 2017 to June 2018, Heuser held visiting professorships at the Sorbonne and at Sciences Po' Paris.  From 2020 to 2022 she held the Jeff Grey Visiting Professorship at the Australian Defence College.

Heuser studies war and specialises in strategic studies, especially nuclear strategy, strategic theory and strategic culture, the transatlantic relations as well as the foreign and defence policies of Germany, France and Great Britain.

Bibliography

Monographs
 War: A Genealogy of Western Ideas and Practices (Oxford: Oxford University Press, 2022), .
 Brexit in History. Sovereignty or a European Union? (London: Hurst 2019), .
 Strategy before Clausewitz: Linking Warfare and Statecraft (Abingdon: Routledge, 2017),  (hb);  (pb).
 The Strategy Makers: Thoughts on War and Society from Machiavelli to Clausewitz (Santa Barbara, CA: Praeger, 2010), . 
 The Evolution of Strategy: Thinking War from Antiquity to the Present (Cambridge: Cambridge University Press, 2010), .
 Reading Clausewitz (London: Pimlico, 2002), .
 The Bomb: Nuclear Weapons in their Historical, Strategic and Ethical Context in the series: Turning Points in History   (London: Longman's, 1999), .
 Nuclear Mentalities?  Strategies and Belief Systems in Britain, France and the FRG (London: Macmillan, and New York: St Martin's Press 1998), .
 NATO, Britain, France and the FRG: Nuclear Strategies and Forces for Europe, 1949-2000 (London: Macmillan, and New York: St Martin's Press, 1997, ppb. 1998), .
 Transatlantic Relations: Sharing Ideals and Costs Chatham House Paper (London: Pinter for RIIA, 1996), .
 Western Containment Policies in the Cold War; The Yugoslav Case, 1948-1953 (London: Routledge, 1989), .

Editorship
 (with Isabelle Davion): Batailles - Histoire des grandes mythes nationaux (Paris: Belin, 2020); 
 (with Athena Leoussi): Famous Battles and How They Shaped the Modern World vol 1: From Troy to Courtrai, 1200 BC-1302 AD (Barnsley, Yorkshire: Pen & Sword, 2018); 
 (with Athena Leoussi): Famous Battles and How They Shaped the Modern World vol. 2: From the Armada to Stalingrad, 1588-1943 (Barnsley, Yorkshire: Pen & Sword, 2018);  
 (with Tormod Heier & Guillaume Lasconjarias) Military Exercises: Political Messaging and Strategic Impact, NATO Forum Paper n°26, (Rome, NATO Defence College, April 2018), 396 p.;  http://www.ndc.nato.int/download/downloads.php?icode=546 
 (with Eitan Shamir): Insurgencies and Counterinsurgencies: National Styles and Strategic Cultures (Cambridge : Cambridge University Press, 2017); 389p, Index;  (hb);  (pb). 
 Small Wars and Insurgencies in Theory and Practice, 1500-1850 (Abingdon: Routledge, 2015)  (hb);  (pb).
 Carl von Clausewitz: On War abridged edition in the series Oxford Classics (Oxford: Oxford University Press, 2006), .
 (with Anja Victorine Hartmann): Thinking War, Peace and World Orders from Antiquity until the 20th century (London: Routledge, 2001), .
 (with Cyril Buffet): Haunted by History: Myths in International Relations (Oxford: Berghahn, 1998), .
 (with Robert O'Neill): Securing Peace in Europe, 1945-62: Thoughts for the Post-Cold War Era (London: Macmillan, 1992) .
 Nuclear Weapons and the Future of European Security, London Defence Studies No.8 (1991).

Podcasts
Talking Strategy

References

1961 births
Living people
International relations scholars
Academics of King's College London
Academics of the University of Reading
Deutsche Schule Istanbul alumni
Alumni of the University of Oxford
Alumni of the London School of Economics
University of Marburg alumni
Academic staff of the University of Reims Champagne-Ardenne
German political scientists
German military historians
Academic staff of Bundeswehr University Munich
German women academics
German women historians
Women political scientists